Lincoln Township is a township in Pottawattamie County, Iowa, USA.

History
Lincoln Township was organized in 1876.

References

Townships in Pottawattamie County, Iowa
Townships in Iowa